Sikandara is a town in Kanpur Dehat district in the Indian state of Uttar Pradesh. It is headquarters of tehsil Sikandara.

Location
It is located on NH-2 about 80 km away from kanpur toward west and towards south from Jhinjhak at a distance 20 kilometer. Auraiya city is towards west from Sikandara and Pukhrayan town is toward east. It is also a Sikandra (Assembly constituency).

History
It is said that this township was settled by Sikandar Lodi.

Schools
St. V.N. Public school
Saraswati Inter College
DR. Ambedkar Iner College
Hemant English school,  Hariharpur road, Vikas Nagar, Sikandra
Krishna Public School 
Raj Inter College Sikandra
नन्दलाल उच्चतर माध्यमिक विद्यालय सिकन्दरा

Geography
Sikandara is located at. It has an average elevation of 85 metres (278 feet).

Demographics
1 India census, Sikandara town had a population of 13,580.  Males constitute 53% of the population and females 47%. Sikandara has an average literacy rate of 58%, lower than the national average of 59.5%: male literacy is 64%, and female literacy is 51%. In Sikandara, 16% of the population is under 6 years of age. Data should be latest that is from the census of 2011

.

References

Cities and towns in Kanpur Dehat district

bpy:সিকান্দার